Harm Jan Beertema (born 9 March 1952) is a Dutch politician and former educator. He has been a member of the House of Representatives for the Party for Freedom since 17 June 2010. He focuses on matters of primary, special, secondary and vocational education as well as teachers policy. He was a member of the States of South Holland from 17 March 2011 until 15 July 2011.

References

External links 
  House of Representatives biography

1952 births
Living people
20th-century Dutch educators
21st-century Dutch educators
21st-century Dutch politicians
Dutch schoolteachers
Members of the House of Representatives (Netherlands)
Members of the Provincial Council of South Holland
Party for Freedom politicians
People from Zaanstad